Syed Ziaur Rahman  is a permanent member of 'Board of Trustees' and Chair of the Advisory Council (Section 3), International Association of Medical Colleges (IAOMC). He also serves as elected secretary of IAOMC and Society of Pharmacovigilance, India (SoPI).

Family background and education
Syed Ziaur Rahman's father Hakim Syed Zillur Rahman, grandfather Hakim Syed Fazlur Rahman and great grandfather Hakim Syed Karam Husain were all physicians of Unani medicine.

He earned his matriculation in 1987 from Minto Circle, graduation (MBBS) in 1995 and postgraduation (MD) in 2000 from Jawaharlal Nehru Medical College, a part of Aligarh Muslim University, India. His PhD thesis was a part of the project on health, medications and lifestyle factors in relation to self-rated memory from UWS School of Medicine, University of Western Sydney, Australia.

Contribution in medical science
Rahman contributed in the area of Alternatives to animal testing. He believed in the philosophy of '3Rs" of Russell and Burch" on humane experimental pharmacology. He gave series of lectures during 2004 at "Alternatives, Animal Welfare and the Curriculum – A training Seminar and Workshop" in different cities of India. He addressed in the meetings of International Network for Humane Education (InterNICHE) and International Centre for Alternatives in Research and Education (I-CARE). On the recommendation of Medical Council of India (MCI), and after getting survey related to the attitude of undergraduate medical students towards Alternatives to animal testing and Animal experiments, he initiated and established a separate lab on "Alternatives to Animal Experimentation" in the Department of Pharmacology at Jawaharlal Nehru Medical College. This was the first attempt in any medical college of India to have an exclusive lab where experimental work on animals was demonstrated by Computer aided education. In addition, he edited "A guide to alternatives to animal experiment in pharmacology", which was included in the curriculum of second professional MBBS course. He even translated few papers into Urdu in the field of Alternatives to animal testing.

Rahman also works in the field of Traditional medicine with special reference to Unani medicine. While working on morphine de-addiction properties of medicinal plants, he proposed a modified method for moderately and severely induced morphine dependent rats. He specifically screened Delphinium denudatum for its protective activity in morphine induced physical dependence.

His other field of works is Pharmacovigilance and Pharmacoepidemiology. In the field of Pharmacovigilance, he gave the concept of Pharmacoenvironmentology and differentiated the term Ecopharmacology from Pharmacoenvironmentology. However, some scientists also suggest the term, 'EcoPharmacovigilance' and 'PharmEcovigilance' in place of Pharmacoenvironmentology. He started as editor-in-chief, the official journal of the Society of Pharmacovigilance, India (SoPI) in 2003 – "Journal of Pharmacovigilance & Drug Safety"

Medico-social services
Rahman is a Trustee of Ibn Sina Academy of Medieval Medicine and Sciences. He bequeathed his ancestral property worth of crores of rupees to this Academy. In the Academy, he arranged many medical camps on the occasion of World AIDS Day, World Health Day and World Tuberculosis Day.

Rahman is a fellow and member of many professional academic bodies such as 'Fellow of International Medical Sciences Academy' (FIMSA), 'Fellow of National Academy of Medical Sciences (FAMS), 'Elected Member of National Academy of Medical Sciences, India' (MAMS), 'Fellow of IMA Academy of Medical Specialties (FIAMS), Indian Science Congress Association, Indian Medical Association, Safety Pharmacology Society, Australian and New Zealand Society of the History of Medicine, Australasian Society of Clinical and Experimental Pharmacologists and Toxicologists, International Society for Neurochemistry, International Brain Research Organization, IndiaCLEN (Regional network of INCLEN), Indian Science News Association (Science and Culture), Association of Physiologists and Pharmacologists of India, Indian Pharmacological Society and Academics of Indian origin, Australia.

Selected awards
International Alumni Leadership Award, Western Sydney University, Australia, 2018
 Mewat Ratan Award 2022 (Literary and Social Contribution)- Global Welfare Foundation, Haryana, India, 2.1.2023 
 Pharma Ratan Award 2017 - Excellence in Healthcare, RDM, India, 26.11.2017 
 International Postgraduate Research Scholarship, Western Sydney University, Australia, 2009-2012
 14th Prof. M. Nasim Ansari Oration, Ibn Sina Academy of Medieval Medicine and Sciences, World Health Day 2022
 ISN Fellowship, 20th Biennial Meeting of the ISN-European Society for Neurochemistry (ESN), Austria, 2005.
 ISN Fellowship, First Special Neurochemistry Conference, International Society for Neurochemistry (ISN), France, 2004
 WHO Fellowship, Second International Conference on Improving Use of Medicines (ICIUM 2004), Thailand, 2004
 WHO Fellowship, 2nd Asian Course on Problem-Based Pharmacotherapy Teaching, Universiti Kebangsaan Malaysia, Malaysia, 2003.
 APSN Fellowship, 6th Biennial Meeting of the Asia Pacific Society for Neurochemistry, 2004, Hong Kong.
 SPS Junior Scientist Award, Safety Pharmacology Society, USA, 2005 & 2006.
 The African Institute of Biomedical Science and Technology (AiBST) Scholarship, Kenya, 2003
 John Autian Travel Award, Annual Conference of Indian Pharmacological Society, India, 1998 and 2002.

Selected publications

See also
Environmental Impact of Pharmaceutical Drugs
Environmental pharmacology
Pharmacovigilance
Alternatives to animal testing
Lifestyle drug

References

External links
 Scopus, a citation database of peer-reviewed literature
 Google Scholar, a citation database of research papers

20th-century Indian medical doctors
Indian pharmacologists
Indian Muslims
Living people
People from Aligarh
1972 births
Aligarh Muslim University alumni
Academic staff of Aligarh Muslim University
Indian medical academics
Gardēzī Sadaat
Urdu–English translators
Western Sydney University alumni
Indian medical researchers
Medical doctors from Uttar Pradesh
Indian scientists
Indian scientific authors
Fellows of the National Academy of Medical Sciences
Indian medical educators